Vaughn Anthony Walsh (born 2 December 1964) is a former Antiguan cricketer who played first-class and List A cricket from 1992 to 1997. 

Vaughn Walsh was considered one of the fastest bowlers in the West Indies in the early 1990s. While living in England in 1991, in a match for his club Leicester Nomads he took 9 for 2. He played three seasons for Leeward Islands from 1991-92 to 1993-94, with best first-class figures of 6 for 77 against Guyana in his second match. He played the 1995-96 and 1996-97 seasons for Griqualand West in South Africa, when his best figures were 6 for 52 in his first match.

References

External links
 
 Vaughn Walsh at Cricket Archive

1964 births
Living people
Antigua and Barbuda cricketers
Leeward Islands cricketers
Griqualand West cricketers